Sandvik Church is a parish church of the Church of Norway in Bergen Municipality in Vestland county, Norway. It is located in the Sandviken neighborhood in the city of Bergen. It is the church for the Sandviken parish which is part of the Bergen domprosti (arch-deanery) in the Diocese of Bjørgvin. The brown, stone church was built in a long church design in 1881 using plans drawn up by the architects Ernst Norgrenn and Schak Bull. The church seats about 500 people.

History
In 1874, the Sandviken neighborhood was separated from the Korskirken parish to become its own parish. In 1876, the area became a part of the city of Bergen. Since the new parish had no church, a limited architectural competition between Conrad Fredrik von der Lippe, Giovanni Müller, and Ernst Norgrenn was held to determine who would design the new church. Ernst Norgrenn won and was hired to design the church, however, he died in 1880, before the church was completed. The project was completed by his assistant, Schak Bull. The large stone church was designed in a Neo-Gothic style. The church was consecrated on 30 December 1881. Originally, the church had a sacristy on the north and the south side of the chancel. In 1903, the southern sacristy was enlarged to so that it was similar to the one on the north side. In 1917–1918, both sacristies were expanded according to plans by the architect Caspar Hassel.

Media gallery

See also
List of churches in Bjørgvin

References

Churches in Bergen
Long churches in Norway
Stone churches in Norway
19th-century Church of Norway church buildings
Churches completed in 1881
1881 establishments in Norway